Beli Breg is a village in Boychinovtsi Municipality, Montana Province, north-western Bulgaria.

References

Villages in Montana Province